Mario Carreño y Morales (May 24, 1913 in Havana, Cuba – December 20, 1999 in Santiago de Chile, Chile) was a Cuban painter.

He studied painting at the Academia de San Alejandro, Havana, Cuba from 1925 until 1926. In 1934, he studied at the Real Academia de Bellas Artes de San Fernando, Madrid, Spain. In 1937 he was a student at the Ecole des Arts appliqués, Paris, France and that same year, at the Académie Julian, Paris, France.  Among his teachers was Jaime Colson.

Solo exhibitions
 1930 – "Mario Carreño", Salón de Merás y Rico, Havana, Cuba
 1947 – "Carreño: Recent Paintings",  Perls Galleries, New York City
 1978 – "Mario Carreño. Pinturas", Museo de Bellas Artes de Caracas, Caracas,  Venezuela
 2000 – "Exposición en Homenaje a Mario Carreño", Galería de Arte Patricia Ready, Santiago de Chile, Chile

Group exhibitions
 1932 – "Exposición Única de Pintores y Escultores Cubanos", Lyceum, Havana, Cuba
 1943 – "The Latin American Collection", Museum of Modern Art, New York City
 1944 – " Exhibition of Modern Cuban Painters, March 17, 1944, Museum of Modern Art, MoMA, New York City
 1951 – I São Paulo Art Biennial, Sao Paulo, Brazil
 1952 – XXVI Venice Biennale, Venice, Italy
 1953 – "II São Paulo Art Biennial, Sao Paulo, Brazil

Awards
 1956 – Guggenheim International Award, New York City
 1982 – National Prize of Art of Chile, Santiago de Chile, Chile
 1987 – Cintas Foundation Fellowship, New York City

Collections
Many of his pieces are in the permanent collections of:
 Carrol Reece Museum, East Tennessee State University, Johnson City, Tennessee
 Metropolitan Museum and Art Center, Coral Gables, Florida
 Colección D.O.P. by Fundacion D.O.P., Paris
 Museo de Bellas Artes, Santiago, Chile,
 Museo Nacional de Bellas Artes de La Habana, Havana, Cuba
 Museum of Modern Art, New York City
 International Business Machine, New York City
 Comesana Family, havana, Cuba
 Muscarelle Museum of Art, Williamsburg, Virginia

References
 Mario Carreño: Selected Works (1936-1957), by Jesús Fernández Torna. 
 Vicente Báez, Virilio Pinera, Calvert Casey, and Anton Arrufat, Editors; Pintores Cubanos, Editors; Ediciones Revolucion, Havana, Cuba 1962 
  Jose Veigas-Zamora, Cristina Vives Gutiérrez, Adolfo V. Nodal, Valia Garzón, Dannys Montes de Oca; Memoria: Cuban Art of the 20th Century; (California/International Arts Foundation 2001); 
 Jose Viegas; Memoria: Artes Visuales Cubanas Del Siglo XX; (California International Arts 2004);   
 Eduardo Luis Rodríguez; The Havana Guide: Modern Architecture 1925-1965''; (Princeton Architectural Press 2000);

External links
 Ediciones Vanguardia Cubana. Libros de Pintura Cubana, Mario Carreño
 www.mariocarreno.com
 Sinfonía en Amarillo important artwork from 1952 which represented the artist at the pavilion of Cuba in the II Biennial of São Paulo in 1953 (Cataloged in pag.113, under N° 9 of the Biennial catalog)

People from Havana
Modern painters
Cuban contemporary artists
Académie Julian alumni
1913 births
1999 deaths
20th-century Cuban painters
20th-century Cuban male artists
Naturalized citizens of Chile
Male painters